Ryhope East was one of two railway stations to have served the village of Ryhope, Tyne and Wear, North East England. Opened in 1858 as a stop on the short Londonderry, Seaham and Sunderland Railway, it became a minor stop on the Durham Coast Line following that line's incorporation into it in 1905.

History 
In 1854 the Londonderry Railway opened the Londonderry, Seaham and Sunderland Railway to link its network of colliery railways to the newly constructed South Dock in Sunderland due to the lack of capacity in Seaham Harbour. The station was originally named Ryhope and was designed by Brewer, Estate Clarke of Works of the Marquess of Londonderry at the time, who was responsible for its architecture being distinct from that of others North Eastern Railway stations in the vicinity North Eastern Railway.

From 1868 the LS&SR began to use the Hendon terminus of the NER's Durham to Sunderland Line until the NER replaced this in turn with Sunderland Central station in 1879. Although the LS&SR shared the NER's Sunderland terminus, it was not until 1900 that the Londonderry Railway agreed to sell its Seaham to Sunderland route to the NER and, following this acquisition, the line was extended along the coast to West Hartlepool in 1905. To distinguish the station from the NER's other Ryhope station on the Durham to Sunderland Line, the station was renamed Ryhope East in 1904.

The station closed to passengers on 7 March 1960, but remained open to goods traffic until 1964.

References

External links 

Disused railway stations in Tyne and Wear
Former North Eastern Railway (UK) stations
Railway stations in Great Britain opened in 1855
Railway stations in Great Britain closed in 1964
1855 establishments in England
1964 disestablishments in England
Sunderland